Bryan Pérez (born November 1, 1988) is a former professional footballer and coach.

Career

Youth and college
As a child, Pérez was a member of Costa Rican powerhouse Saprissa's Futbol Academy, and at the age of 11 he was chosen to be a member of Saprissa traveling youth club. Pérez moved with his family to Miramar, Florida in the early 2000s; he attended Miami Killian High School, and went on to play four years of college soccer at the University of Missouri-Kansas City, ending his career there as the team's all-time leader in goals (29), points (70), shots(160), and games played (78).

During his college years, Pérez also played with Kansas City Brass in the USL Premier Development League.

Professional
Pérez was signed by Miami FC of the USSF Division 2 Professional League in February 2010. He made his professional debut on June 19, 2010 as a substitute in a 3-1 loss to the Austin Aztex, but played just one more game for Miami before being released by the team mid-season.

Having been able to secure a professional contract with another team, Pérez signed to play for Des Moines Menace in the USL Premier Development League in 2011.

International
Although Perez has not yet been called up to any national team, he has expressed a preference to play for the Costa Rica national team, should the opportunity arise. Pérez holds dual citizenship with Costa Rica and the United States.

References

External links
 Miami FC bio
 UMKC bio

1988 births
Living people
People from San José, Costa Rica
People from Miramar, Florida
Association football midfielders
Costa Rican footballers
Costa Rican expatriate footballers
Expatriate soccer players in the United States
Deportivo Saprissa players
Kansas City Brass players
Miami FC (2006) players
Des Moines Menace players
Milwaukee Wave players
Kansas City Roos men's soccer players
USL League Two players
USSF Division 2 Professional League players
Major Indoor Soccer League (2008–2014) players
Wichita Wings (2011–2013 MISL) players
Syracuse Silver Knights players
Missouri Comets players
Major Arena Soccer League players
American men's futsal players
Sportspeople from Broward County, Florida
Soccer players from Florida